Bad Frank is an independent action film written and directed by Tony Germinario. It stars Kevin Interdonato, Amanda Clayton and Tom Sizemore.

Plot
After having sex with his wife, seemingly nice guy Frank is having trouble because he's out of his meds. In the meantime, his friend Travis (Brandon Heitkamp) asks him if he'll ride along as backup while he does a job. Frank is reluctant, but agrees ("This is the last time!"). Meeting up with two other men, Mickey (Tom Sizemore) and Niko (Russ Russo), we find out Frank and Mickey have a history. Two other men show up, and we find out it's a drug buy. After some racist banter, Mickey and Niko shoot both men and steal the drugs.

Frank is fighting with his wife, Gina (Amanda Clayton), because of stress over witnessing the shootings and because he still can't get his meds. He meets Travis in a bar and tells him he is going to the police. After returning home, he finds Niko is already there, on the back porch talking to his wife. Frank flips out and tells his wife not to talk to strangers. Pissed, Gina takes the truck and goes to visit her friend, Travis' wife. Once there, Niko shows up again, and with Frank on the phone, Niko abducts her.

Frank goes to his father, Charlie (Ray "Boom-Boom" Mancini), a retired police officer, and asks him for help. They are estranged, because Frank has a history with alcohol, drugs, and violence. When Charlie refuses to help, Frank attacks the bouncer and beats him. Now we begin to find out about "Bad Frank." Frank begins drinking, and we learn through several different voices that Frank used to be some kind of enforcer for Mickey.

In order to force Mickey to give him back his abducted wife, Frank abducts Mickey's daughter Crystal (Lynn Mancinelli). After a phone call to Mickey, Frank and Crystal get drunk, and we find out more about Frank's association with Mickey. Mickey meanwhile has taken Travis prisoner, and shows him a cellphone video of Travis having sex with Gina. Mickey threatens to tell Frank that Travis has had sex with his wife, and reveals more of Bad Frank's past.

Finally Frank and Mickey meet up to exchange hostages. Frank has seen the video, and tells Mickey that he has taken everything from him. He breaks Crystal's neck; Travis bumps Mickey so that Mickey has to shoot Travis first, which gives Frank time to get to Mickey. Frank beats Mickey to death, then, covered in blood, tells Gina he wants to try to start over. The film ends with Frank driving off with Gina crying, still tied up in the back of his truck.

Cast
 Kevin Interdonato as Frank "Bad Frank", an ex-enforcer.
 Amanda Clayton as Gina, Frank's wife, who does not know about Frank's past.
 Tom Sizemore as Mickey Duro, Frank's former employer in crime.
 Brandon Heitkamp as Travis, Frank's friend, who also does not really know about Frank's past.
 Russ Russo as Niko, Mickey's current enforcer.
 Ray Mancini as Charlie, Frank's father and retired heavy-handed police officer.
 Lynn Mancinelli as Crystal Duro, Mickey's daughter.

Production
Bad Frank was reportedly shot for $80,000.

Reception
Morbidly Beautiful writes, "In many respects, Bad Frank is a 'perfect storm,' in which the hard work of all of the production staff and the actors combine to create a tense and entertaining thrill ride that will have you biting your nails in anticipation of what will happen in the next scene."

References

External links
 

2017 films